The 1917 Bucknell football team was an American football team that represented Bucknell University as an independent during the 1917 college football season. In its third and final season under head coach George Johnson, the team compiled a 3–5–1 record.

Schedule

References

Bucknell
Bucknell Bison football seasons
Bucknell football